Rudyard Kipling's The Jungle Book, also known as The Jungle Book, is a 1994 American adventure film co-written and directed by Stephen Sommers, produced by Edward S. Feldman and Raju Patel, from a story by Ronald Yanover and Mark Geldman. It is a live-action adaptation of the Mowgli stories from The Jungle Book (1894) and The Second Jungle Book (1895) by Rudyard Kipling, alongside Walt Disney's animated film of the same name from 1967.

The film stars Jason Scott Lee, Cary Elwes, Lena Headey, Sam Neill, and John Cleese. Unlike most adaptations of Kipling's stories in the animated film, the animal characters in this film do not speak to which the same happened later in 101 Dalmatians, a live action remake of the 1961 animated film of almost the same name.

Released on December 25, 1994, by Walt Disney Pictures, the film received generally positive reviews and grossed $70.7 million in theaters against a $30 million budget.

In 2016, Disney released another live-action adaptation, The Jungle Book, which was more similar and faithful to both the 1967 animated film and Kipling's book.

Plot 
In 1887, during the British Raj in India, Mowgli is the 5-year-old son of the widowed jungle guide Nathoo, whose wife died in childbirth. On one of Nathoo's tours, he leads Colonel Geoffrey Brydon and his men, as well as Brydon's 5-year-old daughter Katherine nicknamed Kitty. Fellow guide Buldeo and two soldiers kill several animals for sport, which enrages Shere Khan, a tiger who serves as the jungle's keeper, and he begins to pursue the tour group. That night, Kitty gives Mowgli her late mother's bracelet as a gift. Mowgli tells Nathoo of a dream where he faced Shere Khan and showed no fear, becoming a tiger himself. Shere Khan attacks the encampment. He succeeds in killing the two soldiers, but when he tries to kill Buldeo, Nathoo defends him and is subsequently mauled to death by Shere Khan. In the confusion, Mowgli is lost in the jungle with his pet wolf cub, Grey Brother, and Brydon and his men presume him killed. Mowgli is taken by Bagheera, a gentle black panther, to the wolf pack. Mowgli also befriends a bear cub named Baloo.

Years pass and Mowgli grows into a young man.  One day, a monkey steals the bracelet and lures Mowgli towards a legendary lost city honoring Hanuman, filled with treasure belonging to King Louie the orangutan, who has the treasure guarded by Kaa, a gigantic python. Forced to fight for his life and the bracelet, Mowgli succeeds in wounding the snake with a bejeweled dagger that he retrieves from the treasure horde. Winning King Louie's respect, Mowgli keeps the dagger as a trophy.

Elsewhere, Kitty and Colonel Brydon are still stationed in India. She and Mowgli meet again, but neither recognize the other. Kitty is also in a relationship with one of Brydon's soldiers, Captain William Boone. Infatuated with her, Mowgli travels to Brydon's fort and enters her room, alerting the guards. Kitty sees that Mowgli is wearing her mother's bracelet and realizes who he is. Boone and his men manage to capture Mowgli with Buldeo's help. They find the jeweled dagger on his possession, which Buldeo recognises as coming from the lost city. Kitty and Dr. Julius Plumford, a good friend of Brydon's, decide that they must reintroduce Mowgli to civilization. In doing so, Mowgli and Kitty fall in love, much to Boone's displeasure. Eventually, Boone convinces Mowgli to tell him of his "Monkey City" and the treasure hoard that it holds, but Mowgli refrains from revealing its location to Boone upon realizing he does not follow the "Jungle Law" and kills for sport rather than survival purposes. Boone later proposes to Kitty, although she is hesitant to concede. Around this time, after Boone and his men publicly humiliate him, Mowgli returns to the jungle as he does not feel at home in the village. After Boone's cruel treatment of Mowgli, Kitty realizes she cannot marry Boone, so Colonel Brydon decides to send her back to England.

Meanwhile, Boone teams up with Buldeo and his friend Tabaqui. The men recruit soldiers Lieutenant Wilkins and Sergeant Harley, and gather some bandits to capture Mowgli in order to find out where the treasure is. Wilkins and Boone shoot Baloo when he comes to Mowgli's defense, much to Mowgli's distress. Buldeo and the bandits then ambush Kitty and Brydon, who is shot and wounded in the process. Even though Mowgli, along with Bagheera, Grey Brother, and the rest of the wolves, attack and fight off the bandits, Buldeo manages to capture Kitty and Brydon and the would-be treasure hunters use them as blackmail: if Mowgli leads them to the treasure, Kitty and her father shall live. That night, the group learn Shere Khan has returned to the Jungle and is hunting them. Because of this, Mowgli decides to escape the group and keep lookout to ensure Kitty's safety.

The next morning, Harley catches Mowgli escaping with the aid of Bagheera and chases him, only to fall into quicksand and drown, despite Wilkins' attempt to save him. Mowgli then has an elephant take the injured Brydon back to the village, after promising him to rescue Kitty. As the journey continues, Tabaqui decides that Mowgli is no longer needed and attempts to murder him, only to be killed himself after toppling off a cliff. Later, Wilkins becomes separated from the group and is mauled to death by Shere Khan. Eventually, the remaining party enters Monkey City, where Buldeo inadvertently entombs himself in a trap while trying to shoot Mowgli. Only Mowgli, Kitty and Boone reach the treasure room, where Mowgli and Boone engage in a fierce fight until Mowgli injures Boone with another dagger. Mowgli then escapes with Kitty, while Boone begins greedily pocketing treasure; until Kaa returns and kills him.

As they escape from the ancient ruins, Mowgli and Kitty are confronted by Shere Khan, who roars at them. However, Mowgli roars back and defiantly stands his ground. Impressed by Mowgli's bravery, Shere Khan acknowledges him as a creature of the jungle and allows him and Kitty to leave peacefully. Mowgli and Kitty reunite with Brydon and Baloo, both of whom have recovered from their injuries under Plumford's care. Having defeated Boone and his men and fulfilled his childhood dream in facing Shere Khan, Mowgli becomes the new lord of the jungle and begins a relationship with Kitty.

Cast 
 Jason Scott Lee as Mowgli, a wild man who was orphaned at 5 years old and was raised by the animals in the jungle of India.
 Sean Naegeli  as 5-year-old Mowgli
 Cary Elwes as Captain William Boone, Kitty's suitor who desires the wealth of the ancient ruins and leads a mutiny in search of it.
 Lena Headey as Katherine "Kitty" Brydon, the feisty and benevolent daughter of Colonel Brydon who is also the childhood friend and romantic interest of Mowgli.
 Joanna Wolff as 5-year-old Kitty
 Sam Neill as Colonel Geoffrey Brydon, Kitty's firm but reasonable father who is the head of the British army stationed in India. He is also the narrator of the film.
 John Cleese as Dr. Julius Plumford, Colonel Brydon's friend who is the medical professional of Brydon's battalion and who assists Kitty in teaching Mowgli the ways of mankind.
 Jason Flemyng as Lieutenant John Wilkins, a soldier in Brydon's battalion and Boone's close friend.
 Stefan Kalipha as Buldeo, an outlaw who knows about the ancient ruins. He is also the man responsible for provoking Shere Khan and causing the death of Mowgli's father Nathoo.
 Ron Donachie as Sergeant Harley, a brutish soldier who sides with Boone in the mutiny.
 Anirudh Agarwal as Tabaqui, a ruthless jungle guide working for Boone. He shares the same name as a golden jackal in Kipling's stories, who was Shere Khan's henchman.
 Faran Tahir as Nathoo, Mowgli's father who served as a guide for Colonel Brydon until he was killed by Shere Khan. This was also Tahir's film debut.

Trained animals 
 Casey as Baloo, a male black bear who was rescued by Mowgli as a cub and his best friend among the animals.
 Shadow as Bagheera, a wise male black panther who took Mowgli to be raised by the wolves and watches over him.
 Shannon as Grey Brother, a male Indian wolf that Mowgli had since childhood and has been his closest companion.
 Lowell as King Louie, a male orangutan who is the leader of a community of monkeys in the ancient ruins.
 Bombay as Shere Khan, a male Bengal tiger who is the keeper of the jungle law. Unlike most versions where he is the villain, he is a neutral force of nature in this film.

Kaa is portrayed by both a computer-generated and an animatronic python, as well as a trained anaconda. Other trained animals included monkeys, Indian elephants, camels, horses, zebus, and wolves. The sounds used for the monkeys were actually those of chimpanzees and siamangs. KNB FX Group crew member Shannon Shea doubled for Baloo in certain shots in an animatronic bear suit.

Production

Pre-production 
Raju Patel, an Indian producer, figured the 100th anniversary of Kipling's "Jungle Book" stories publication should be commemorated with a film adaptation. 

On June 7, 1993, The Walt Disney Company secured distribution rights for the movie in the United States, the United Kingdom, the Nordics and Benelux; in exchange for providing half of the production budget and funding, estimated between $15 to 20 million. In other countries, MDP Worldwide (Mark Damon's company) was the sales agent for the film rights.

Disney chairman Jeffrey Katzenberg saw the potential of adapting the animated classic and assigned Ronald Yonver and Mark Geldman to write the project. Dissatisfied with these scripts, one of which was 180 pages long with no dialogue for the first 70 pages, Katzenberg handed the project to Stephen Sommers after being satisfied with his work on The Adventures of Huck Finn. Sommers, who is a huge fan of the original animated film and various jungle adventure films, was eager to do a lush, romantic adventure and to show the beauty of the jungle. Executives were stunned by Sommers' decisions for the project as some were expecting an exact recreation of the original animated film and others wanted a teen romance to be the main focus.

Casting 
Jason Scott Lee was Sommers' only choice for Mowgli. Disney executives labeled him as “too old" for the role until Sommers convinced them that he would be a much more believable leading man than an unknown teenager. Lee was also cast because the animals reacted to him the best. Sommers and his crew did try to cast actors in India, but due to Bollywood guidelines, their schedules and limits on the number of films they could work on restricted their involvement. However, they were able to cast Stefan Kalipha and Anirudh Agarwal before they agreed to any Bollywood productions. The casting of Cary Elwes as Captain William Boone, Lena Headey as Kitty Brydon, and Sam Neill as Colonel Geoffrey Brydon soon followed. Neill in particular found himself drawn to the role as he comes from a long line of family who served in the British Army during the Raj. The role of Dr. Julius Plumford was always written for John Cleese but Sommers was discouraged that Cleese would never accept it. Cleese agreed to the role after he received the script and fell in love with it. Jason Flemyng made his film debut with this film and his role grew after Sommers instantly bonded with him.

Animals 
For the principal animal actors, a male black bear named Casey was chosen to play a role of Baloo, a male panther named Shadow was chosen to play Bagheera, a purebred female wolf named Shannon was chosen to play Grey Brother, a male tiger named Bombay was chosen to play Shere Khan, and a male orangutan named Lowell was chosen to play King Louie. Lowell was the only animal to play his character all the way through and, according to Sommers, was the easiest and most entertaining animal to work with. Sommers did not want the animal characters to speak like in the animated film and had them perform with the actors and exhibit natural behavior as much as possible. In total, 52 animals including tigers, leopards, bears, wolves, elephants, bulls, monkeys, and horses appear in the film.

Filming 
Filming in Jodhpur in India took eight weeks and included scenes with rhesus macaques and Asian elephants. Indoor scenes like the lost treasure city set were shot on sound stages in Bombay. The jungles in India did not have the exact rainforest look envisioned by the filmmakers, so the jungle scenes were mostly shot in Fripp Island, South Carolina (scenes featuring Bagheera and Shere Khan) as well as Ozone Falls State Natural Area and Fall Creek Falls State Park in Tennessee (scenes featuring Baloo and the wolf pack). Scenes featuring Lowell were shot in a Los Angeles studio against a blue screen due to the production not being able to bring him to India. One of the Asian elephants in the production was named Shirley, and she lived at Wild Adventures Theme Park in Valdosta, Georgia.

Score 
While electronics dominated most of his work during the early 1990s, composer Basil Poledouris returned to his symphonic roots for his score to the film. Most European versions of Milan's official CD release include "Two Different Worlds", a pop song performed by Kenny Loggins.

Release 
The film was released in theaters on December 25, 1994.

Home media 
The film was released by Buena Vista Home Entertainment on VHS and LaserDisc on May 19, 1995. Disney also released the film on DVD January 15, 2002, January 1, 2004, and as a limited edition on May 22, 2017.

Reception

Critical response 
On review aggregator website Rotten Tomatoes, the film received an approval rating of 80% based on 41 reviews, with an average rating of 6.5/10. The site's critical consensus reads: "Rudyard Kipling's The Jungle Book may not hew as closely to the book as its title suggests, but it still offers an entertaining live-action take on a story best known in animated form".

The film was well received, with praise for its performances, action, and visuals, but it was also chided for not staying true to Kipling's work, even though his name remains in the title. Most notably, Roger Ebert of The Chicago Sun-Times shared this sentiment. He said the film "has so little connection to Rudyard Kipling or his classic book that the title is beyond explanation".

He goes on to say that it is a good film, awarding it three stars out of four, but it does not fit its target audience; some "scenes are unsuitable for small children, and the 'PG' rating is laughable".

Brian Lowry of Variety said that, "Technically, Jungle Book is an encyclopedia of wonders, from the dazzling scenery (shot largely in Jodhpur, India), cinematography, costumes and sets, to the animals, who frequently out-emote their two-legged counterparts. Even so, Book may have been more effective had its story stayed on one page". Rita Kempley from The Washington Post was more favorable, stating that "the narrative shifts from romance to adventure the way Cheetah used to hop from foot to foot, but Sommers nevertheless delivers a bully family picture".

Box office
The film grossed $43.2 million in the United States and Canada. Internationally it grossed $27.5 million for a worldwide total of $70.7 million.

Accolades 
The film was nominated for Excellence in Media's 1994 Golden Angel Award for best motion picture. It was also nominated for Best Action, Adventure or Thriller Film at the Saturn Awards.

Year-end lists 
 Honorable mention – Betsy Pickle, Knoxville News-Sentinel
 Top 18 worst (alphabetically listed, not ranked) – Michael Mills, The Palm Beach Post

Video game 
The film was adapted into a 1996 video game, which includes clips from the film, while providing an original story and new characters. The game follows the player in his or her quest to save the jungle. Soldiers have stolen King Louie's crown and the player must recover it to prevent the jungle from losing its magic. The player is aided by a Scotsman named Ilgwom ("Mowgli" spelled backwards) and his chimpanzee Lahtee, while also guided by a spirit made from Mowgli's memories.

References

External links 
 
 
 

The Jungle Book films
1994 films
1994 drama films
1990s adventure comedy-drama films
American adventure comedy-drama films
1990s English-language films
Films directed by Stephen Sommers
Films scored by Basil Poledouris
Films set in the British Raj
Films set in India
Films about animals
Films about tigers
Films about orphans
Films shot in British Columbia
Films shot in Rajasthan
Films shot in North Carolina
Films shot in South Carolina
Films shot in Tennessee
Films set in 1887
Films set in 1907
Films about interracial romance
Walt Disney Pictures films
Films shot in India
Jungle adventure films
The Jungle Book (franchise)
Live-action films based on Disney's animated films
Remakes of American films
American children's adventure films
Films produced by Edward S. Feldman
Films about father–daughter relationships
1990s American films